Gerardo Masana (February 1, 1937 – November 11, 1973) Argentine founder of comedy-musical group Les Luthiers in 1965. Masana died of leukemia eight years later, on November 11, 1973. The other members of Les Luthiers remained together until Daniel Rabinovich died in 2015, as of 2017 they still perform live in tours through Latin America and Spain.

References

1937 births
1973 deaths
Argentine musicians
Les Luthiers
Argentine people of Spanish descent
Argentine people of Catalan descent
Deaths from leukemia
People from Banfield, Buenos Aires